"Pride" is a single release by Scottish recording artist Amy Macdonald; it was released as the second single from her third studio album, Life in a Beautiful Light. It was released on 13 August 2012 and was written by Amy Macdonald and produced by Pete Wilkinson.

Background
In an interview with BBC Breakfast on 11 June 2012, Macdonald said that the song was inspired from when she sings the national anthem of Scotland at Hampden Park. She also said she is lucky that she gets asked to perform before all of Scotland's international matches. Macdonald says it is an honor and it is something that she always gets nervous about, but it is such a buzz afterwards that she loves to do it.

Live performances
On 7 July 2012 she performed the song at T in the Park in the King Tut's Wah Wah Tent. On 7 August 2012 she performed the song on daily entertainment show Beat TV on ITV2 which is also shown in 30 other countries including South Africa, United States and Italy. On 14 August 2012 she performed the song on The Rob Brydon Show. On 21 December 2012 she performed the song on The Graham Norton Show. On 10 September 2012 she performed a modified version of the song at 'Our Greatest Team Parade' held in London to celebrate the success of British athletes at the Olympic and Paralympic Games.

Music video

Background
On 11 July 2012, Macdonald announced that she would be filming the video saying "Filming the video for Pride 2moro in Glasgow. Praying for a bit of respite from this beautiful Scottish summertime!" On 12 July 2012 she wrote "What a surprise! It's not raining!! Got loads of extra people helping in the video today, my bits not till later! Can't wait to see it :-)". The music video was first released onto YouTube on 6 August 2012 at a total length of three minutes and twenty-four seconds. Shortly after the video was uploaded it had to be removed due to technical issues. A new music video was uploaded shortly afterwards.

Synopsis
The video for "Pride" begins with Amy walking beside the River Clyde in Glasgow, it then shows Macdonald singing on a roof in Glasgow city centre. The video also shows a variety of people across Scotland including a footballer and a young boy walking into Hampden Park, two young girls in a Judo match, a farmer, a family, two sailors, a man who carried the Olympic torch, a local football team and a welder. The video also shows shots of Loch Lommond, Hampden Park and aerial shots of Glasgow.

Track listing

Chart performance

Release history

References

External links
Amy Macdonald official website

2012 singles
Amy Macdonald songs
Songs written by Amy Macdonald
2012 songs
Mercury Records singles